Charles Burns (born September 27, 1955) is an American cartoonist and illustrator.
His early work was published in a Sub Pop fanzine, and he achieved prominence in the early issues of RAW. His graphic novel Black Hole won the Harvey Award.

Career

Comics
Charles Burns' earliest works include illustrations for the Sub Pop fanzine, and Another Room Magazine of Oakland, but he came to prominence when his comics were published for the first time in early issues of RAW, the avant-garde comics magazine founded in 1980 by Françoise Mouly and Art Spiegelman. In 1982, Burns did a die-cut cover for RAW #4. Raw Books also published two books of Burns as RAW One-Shots: Big Baby and Hard-Boiled Defective Stories. In 1994, he was awarded a Pew Fellowships in the Arts. In 1999, he showed at the Pennsylvania Academy of the Fine Arts.

Most of Burns' short stories, published in various supports over the decades, were later collected in the three volumes of the "Charles Burns' Library" (hardcovers from Fantagraphics Books): El Borbah (1999), Big Baby (2000), and Skin Deep (2001). (A fourth and last volume, Bad Vibes, has yet to be published, which would have the Library collecting the entirety of his pre-Black Hole comics work.  It was later stated that Burns did not feel there was enough material for a complete fourth volume.)

From 1993 to 2004, he serialized the 12 chapters of his Harvey Award-winning graphic novel Black Hole (12 issues from Kitchen Sink Press and Fantagraphics Books). The series was collected into a single volume in 2005.  Black Hole was featured prominently in the film Dawn of the Planet of the Apes.

In 2007 Burns contributed material for the French made animated horror anthology Fear(s) of the Dark.

In October 2010, Burns released the first part of a new series, X'ed Out.  Part two of the new trilogy, The Hive, was released in October 2012. Sugar Skull, the final installment in the trilogy, was released Fall of 2014. The series was collected into a single volume, Last Look, published by Pantheon in 2016.

Illustration
Burns' high-profile illustrations include album cover work for the Iggy Pop album Brick by Brick.  His art was also licensed by The Coca-Cola Company to illustrate product and advertising material for their failed OK Soda product. More recently, he has worked on advertising campaigns for Altoids and portrait illustrations for The Believer. In the early 1990s, his Dogboy stories were adapted by MTV as a live-action serial for Liquid Television. In 1991, choreographer Mark Morris commissioned him to create illustrations that were then used as a basis for his version of Tchaikovsky's The Nutcracker, The Hard Nut. Burns's style was a source of inspiration for Martin Ander's artwork for Fever Ray, Karin Dreijer Andersson's solo project.

Publications

Comics and graphic novels
 1988 Hardboiled Defective Stories (Pantheon Books) 
 1991 Curse of the Molemen (Kitchen Sink Press) 
 1992 front cover of The Residents - Freak Show (Dark Horse Comics) 
 1995 Black Hole 1 (Kitchen Sink Press) 
 1995 Black Hole 2 (Kitchen Sink Press) 
 1996 Black Hole 3 (Kitchen Sink Press) 
 1997 Black Hole 4 (Kitchen Sink Press) 
 1998 Black Hole 5 (Fantagraphics Books) 
 1998 Black Hole 6 (Fantagraphics Books) 
 1999 El Borbah (Fantagraphics Books) 
 2000 Big Baby (Fantagraphics Books) 
 2000 Black Hole 7 (Fantagraphics Books) 
 2000 Black Hole 8 (Fantagraphics Books) 
 2001 Skin Deep: Tales of Doomed Romance (Fantagraphics Books) 
 2001 Black Hole 9 (Fantagraphics Books) 
 2002 Black Hole 10 (Fantagraphics Books) 
 2003 Black Hole 11 (Fantagraphics Books) 
 2004 Black Hole 12 (Fantagraphics Books) 
 2005 Black Hole (Pantheon Books) ; collects Black Hole 1-12
 2010 X'ed Out (Pantheon Books) 
 2012 The Hive (Pantheon Books) 
 2014  Sugar Skull (Pantheon Books) 
 2016 Last Look (Pantheon Books) ; collects X'ed Out, The Hive and Sugar Skull
 2019 Dédales (Cornélius, France) 
 2021 Dédales 2 (Cornélius, France)

Illustration books
 1998 Facetasm, Green Candy Press (in collaboration with Gary Panter)
 2007 One Eye (Pantheon Books) 
 Permagel, French A3 sized publication in black and white
 Love Nest, Éditions Cornélius, hardcover
 Vortex, Éditions Cornélius, hardcover, full color
 Johnny 23, Le Dernier Cri

References

Sources
Charles Burns page at Fantagraphics - Books in print from this publisher.
Brian Heater, "Interview: Charles Burns Pt. 1", The Daily Cross Hatch, (November 10, 2008).
"I'm Slowly Learning to Draw Every Human Being in the United States," Interview with Hillary Chute, The Believer, January 2008

External links
 Charles Burns at Lambiek's Comiclopedia

 

American comics artists
American graphic novelists
Album-cover and concert-poster artists
Alternative cartoonists
Evergreen State College alumni
University of California, Davis alumni
Writers from Washington, D.C.
Raw (magazine)
Living people
1955 births
Pew Fellows in the Arts
American male novelists
Weird fiction writers